Captain Thomas Cooper (January 15, 1833April 5, 1906) was a 19th-century Boston maritime pilot. He was a well-known Boston pilot that took more battleships on their trial trips than any pilot on the coast. He was a leader among the branch pilots of Boston for 50 years. He had ownership in the Boston pilot boats Friend, Varuna, and Columbia.

Early life

Cooper was born on January 15, 1833, in Stanstead, Quebec. His parents were John Cooper and Agnes Miller. He married Catharine McGowan on May 29, 1855, in Boston, Massachusetts. They had two children, Charles Thomas Cooper and Agnus Isabelle Cooper. His daughter, Agnes Isabelle Cooper, would later marry William Robinson Lampee's son Charles Walter Lampee. Charles W. Lampee and Agnes I. Cooper had two boys, Charles Irving Lampee and Thomas Cooper Lampee. Charles I. Lampee wrote about his boyhood experiences on pilot boats sixty years later in a article called Memories of Cruises on Boston Pilot Boats of Long Ago. Since both of his grandfathers were Boston pilots, he was able to listen to their conversations of pilot boats and life of the sea.

Career

Cooper started his career on a pilot boat that went around the Cape Horn to San Francisco. He returned to Boston in the summer of 1852. He became an apprentice boat-keeper on the Boston pilot-boat Daniel Webster, which was built in 1851 at Chelsea, Massachusetts. Captain William Robinson Lampee was also a pilot on the Webster. Cooper continued on the Webster until 1857. 

He joined the Boston police force in May 1857 and served for over eighteen years. He was also a member of the Boston Marine Society. He was a leader among the branch pilots of Boston for 50 years.

Cooper took more battleships on their trial trips than any pilot on the coast. On October 16, 1895, Captain Cooper was in charge of the United States Navy battleship USS Indiana on her trial trip. On September 8, 1898, pilot Cooper piloted the big battleship Massachusetts safely through the Boston narrows as far as the Boston Light, where he left the battleship for a  station boat. The Massachusetts was on her way to dry dock at the Brooklyn Navy Yard.

Captain Cooper served as first boat-keeper of the new pilot boat Edwin Booth, No. 2, of which he had become a part owner, for fifteen months, and was granted a warrant commission as pilot of the port of Boston on May 8, 1868. In July 1882, after many successful years of service, the Edwin Booth was sold to Pensacola, Florida, parties for $5,000 and a new larger boat, the Eben D. Jordan was built by Cooper to take her place.

Eben D. Jordan

Captain Cooper was owner and ship master of the 65-ton pilot boat Eben D. Jordan, No. 2, built in 1883 by Ambrose A. Martin in East Boston. The boat's name was in honor of Eben Dyer Jordan, the founder of the Jordan Marsh department stores. At the launch, Mr. Jordan gave Cooper a set of  signal flags for use on his pilot-boat. 

The Eben D. Jordan, was registered as a pilot Schooner with the Record of American and Foreign Shipping, from 1884 to 1900. Her hailing port was the Port of Boston. The Jordan was sold in 1892 when Cooper became captain of the pilot boat Friend.

Friend

The Boston pilot-boat Friend, No. 7, was owned by Captain Cooper, Lampee and a consortium of pilots. She was built at the Dennison J. Lawlor's shipyard in East Boston in early 1887.

After Captain William Lampee died in 1892, Thomas Cooper became Captain and used the Friend on cruises from 1892 through 1893. On October 21, 1893, Captain Cooper sold the Friend, to the New York Pilots. Cooper wanted a more up-to-date vessel to challenge the Hesper, Varuna, and other boats in the Boston fleet. In 1894, Cooper replaced the  Friend, with the pilot-boat Columbia.

Columbia

The Boston pilot-boat Columbia, No. 8, was built for Captain Cooper and his colleagues. Cooper was the managing owner of the Columbia. She was launched from the Ambrose A. Martin shipyard in East Boston Massachusetts shipyard on May 17, 1894. The Columbia, was built to replace the pilot-boat Friend, No. 7, that was sold. 

Boat-keeper Charles Benthram, of the pilot boat Liberty, No. 3, received his training by his uncle, Thomas Cooper on the pilot boat Columbia, No. 2. 

On November 26, 1898, Captain Cooper went to see the wreck Columbia, when she was driven ashore at the Sand Hills beach in Scituate in the great Portland Gale. After seeing the wreck, and realizing she could not be salvaged, he sold her to a marine junk dealer. Cooper had his share of the boat insured, but the other owners were not covered.

Varuna

After the Columbia wreck in 1898, Captain Cooper was transferred to the Boston pilot boat Varuna, No. 6, as he had ownership in the Varuna. The Varuna, was a 90-ton schooner, built in 1890 by Howard & Montgomery at Chelsea, Massachusetts, and designed by Edward Burgess. 

On 12 November 1900, Captain Cooper was on the pilot boat Varuna, No. 6, when he encountered bad weather 70 miles east of the Boston Light. A huge wave came onboard, which carried away boat-keeper Sidney Campbell and caused considerable damage to the boat. Once the weather was calmer, Cooper return the boat to port.

Death

Cooper died, at age 73, on April 5, 1906, in Chelsea, Massachusetts. Funeral services were held in Chelsea, officiated by Rev. R. Perry Bush, pastor of the First Universalist Church. Members of the Boston Pilots' Association and others were in attendance. His burial was at the Woodlawn Cemetery.

See also

 List of Northeastern U. S. Pilot Boats

References

People from Boston
1833 births
1906 deaths
Maritime pilotage
Sea captains